Vacation from Love is a 1938 American comedy film directed by George Fitzmaurice, written by Patterson McNutt and Harlan Ware, and starring Dennis O'Keefe, Florence Rice, Reginald Owen, June Knight, Edward Brophy and Truman Bradley. It was released on September 30, 1938, by Metro-Goldwyn-Mayer.

Plot

The plot follows Patricia Lawson who is about to marry T. Ames Piermont III. On the day of their civil ceremony, poor saxophone player Bill Blair objects to the marriage and Patricia decides to run off with him, leaving T. Ames at the altar.

Cast 
Dennis O'Keefe as W.D. 'Bill' Blair
Florence Rice as Patricia Lawson
Reginald Owen as John Hodge Lawson
June Knight as Flo Heath
Edward Brophy as Barney Keenan
Truman Bradley as Mark Shelby
Tom Rutherford as T. Ames Piermont III
Andrew Tombes as Judge Brandon
Herman Bing as Oscar Wittlesbach
George Zucco as Dr. Waxton
Paul Porcasi as French Judge
J. M. Kerrigan as Danny Dolan
Armand Kaliz as M. Fumagolly
Roger Converse as Wedding Usher

References

External links 
 

1938 films
American comedy films
1938 comedy films
Metro-Goldwyn-Mayer films
Films directed by George Fitzmaurice
American black-and-white films
Films scored by Edward Ward (composer)
1930s English-language films
1930s American films
English-language comedy films